The 1979–80 Divizia B was the 40th season of the second tier of the Romanian football league system.

The format has been maintained to three series, each of them having 18 teams. At the end of the season the winners of the series promoted to Divizia A and the last four places from each series relegated to Divizia C.

Team changes

To Divizia B
Promoted from Divizia C
 CS Botoșani
 Energia Gheorghiu-Dej
 Unirea Focșani
 Cimentul Medgidia
 Mecanică Fină București
 Flacăra-Automecanica Moreni
 Pandurii Târgu Jiu
 Unirea Alba Iulia
 Strungul Arad
 Someșul Satu Mare
 Carpați Mârșa
 Viitorul Gheorgheni

Relegated from Divizia A
 Corvinul Hunedoara
 UTA Arad
 Bihor Oradea

From Divizia B
Relegated to Divizia C
 Relon Ceahlăul Piatra Neamț
 Drobeta Turnu-Severin
 Mureșul Deva
 Oltul Sfântu Gheorghe
 Electroputere Craiova
 CIL Sighetu Marmației
 Victoria Tecuci
 SN Oltenița
 Victoria Călan
 Constructorul Iași
 Chimia Brazi
 CFR Timișoara

Promoted to Divizia A
 FCM Galați
 Viitorul Scornicești
 Universitatea Cluj

Renamed teams
Dinamo Slatina was renamed as Energia Slatina.

Steagul Roșu Brașov was renamed as FCM Brașov.

League tables

Serie I

Serie II

Serie III

See also 
 1979–80 Divizia A
 1979–80 Divizia C
 1979–80 County Championship

References

Liga II seasons
Romania
2